Hyperparachma bursarialis is a species of snout moth in the genus Hyperparachma. It was described by Francis Walker in 1866, and is known from Honduras, Venezuela, the West Indies and Brazil.

References

Chrysauginae
Pyralidae of South America
Moths described in 1866
Invertebrates of Venezuela
Moths of Central America
Invertebrates of Brazil